Pirkei de-Rabbi Eliezer (also Pirkei DeRabbi Eliezer; Aramaic: פרקי דרבי אליעזר, or פרקים דרבי אליעזר, Chapters of Rabbi Eliezer; abbreviated PdRE) is an aggadic-midrashic work on the Torah containing exegesis and retellings of biblical stories. 

The composition has enjoyed widespread circulation and recognition ever since its composition. It is quoted by rishonim under various names, including Pirkei Rabbi Eliezer ha-Gadol, Pirkei Rabbi Eliezer ben Hyrcanus, Baraita de-Rabbi Eliezer and Haggadah de-Rabbi Eliezer ben Hyrcanus.

Traditionally, it is ascribed to the tanna Rabbi Eliezer ben Hyrcanus and his disciples. Leopold Zunz has suggested that the book has had interpolations made to copies owned by private citizens in the 8th century. Isaak Jost first noticed the inclusion of 8th century interpolations. According to Jewish Encyclopedia it was composed in Italy shortly after 830.  Scholars unanimously agree that Pirke de-Rabbi Eliezer is a work of the 8th or 9th century. The earliest citation of it is in a fragment from Pirqoi ben Baboi.

Contents

Chapters
The work is divided into 54 chapters, which may be divided into seven groups, as follows:

 Ch. 1-2: Introduction to the entire work, dealing with the youth of R. Eliezer ben Hyrcanus, his thirst for knowledge, and his settlement at Jerusalem.
 Ch. 3-11 (corresponding to Genesis 1–2): The six days of the Creation.
On the first day occurred the creation of four kinds of angels and of the 47 clouds.
The second day: the creation of heaven, other angels, the fire in mankind (impulse), and the fire of Gehenna.
The third day: the division of the waters, fruit-trees, herbs, and grass.
The fourth day: creation of the lights; astronomy and the determination of the intercalation.
The leap-year reckoning is imparted to Adam, Enoch, Noah, Shem, Abraham, Isaac, and Jacob.
The fifth day: birds and fishes; enumeration of the kinds which may be eaten. Also, the story of Jonah, which is said to belong to the fifth day.
The sixth day: God's conference with the Torah in regard to the way in which man should be created. Since God is the first king of the world, all the great rulers are enumerated in order to refer to God as the first one.
 Ch. 12-23 (= Gen. 2–8, 24, 29:1): The time from Adam to Noah.
 The placing of man in the Garden of Eden and the creation of Eve.
 Description of the three evil qualities which shorten the life of man—envy, lust, and ambition.
 Identification of the serpent with Samael.
 Announcement of the ten appearances of God upon earth ("eser yeridot").
 First appearance of God in the Garden of Eden, and the punishment of the first pair.
 The two ways, the good and the evil, are pointed out to Adam, who enters upon his penitence. (The story is interrupted here, to be continued in ch. 20)
Detailed discussion of the three pillars of the world—the Torah, the Avodah, and Gemilut Hasadim (see Avot 1:2).
God's kindness toward Adam, that of the Hananites toward Jacob, and the consideration to be shown to those in mourning.
 The literary quarrel between the Shammaites and the Hillelites as to whether heaven or earth was created first.
 The ten things which were created on Friday evening.
 Exegesis of Psalm 8, which Adam sang in the Garden of Eden.
 Discussion of the Havdalah blessing of the Sabbath evening and the completion of Adam's penitence.
 Cain and Abel; Cain's penitence.
 Birth of Seth; the sinful generation.
 Story of Noah.
 Ch. 24-25 (= Genesis 9-11, 18, 19): The sinful generation.
 Nimrod.
 God's second appearance.
 The confusion of tongues and the Dispersion.
 Nimrod is killed by Esau, who takes his garments, which Jacob then puts on in order to secure the blessing.
 Ch. 26-39 (= Genesis 40, 50): From Abraham to the death of Jacob.
 The ten temptations of Abraham.
 Lot's imprisonment and Abraham's pursuit of the kings.
 God's covenant with Abraham.
 The circumcision, and the appearance of the angels.
 Identification of Hagar with Keturah, and the story of Ishmael.
 The sacrifice of Isaac.
 Isaac and Rebekah, Jacob and Esau.
 Proofs given by Elijah, Elisha, and Shallum ben Tikvah that the dead are resurrected through the liberality of the living.
 Those that will be found worthy to be resurrected.
 From the sale of the birthright to the time when Jacob left Beer-sheba.
 From Jacob at the well to his flight from Laban's house.
 Repetition of the three preceding chapters.
 Story of Dinah and of the sale of Joseph.
 God's fourth appearance—in the vision of Jacob while on his way to Egypt.
 Joseph and Potiphar.
 Joseph in prison; interpretation of the dream; the sale of the grain.
 Jacob's blessing and death.
 Ch. 40-46 (= Exodus 2–4, 14–20, 22–34): From the appearance of Moses to the time when God revealed Himself to him in the cleft of the rock.
 Fifth appearance of God—to Moses, from the burning bush.
 The miracles performed by Moses before Pharaoh.
 God's sixth appearance—on Sinai.
 Pharaoh's persecution.
 The value of penitence; Pharaoh is not destroyed, but becomes King of Nineveh.
 Amalek's pursuit in the desert; Saul and Amalek; Amalek and Sennacherib.
 The golden calf; Moses' descent from the mountain; his prayer because of Israel's sin.
 Moses on Sinai; his descent, and the destruction of the golden calf.
 Seventh appearance of God—to Moses.
 Ch. 47-54 (= Exodus 15; Numbers 2, 5, 11–13, 25, 26; in these chapters the sequence thus far observed is broken): The sin committed at Baal-peor.
 The courage of Phinehas.
 The priestly office conferred upon him for life as a recompense.
 Computation of the time Israel spent in servitude down to the exodus from Egypt.
 Continuation of the story of Amalek.
 The passing over to Nebuchadnezzar and Haman.
 Story of Esther.
 Holiness of the months and of Israel.
 Enumeration of the seven miracles:
 Abraham in the furnace
 Jacob's birth
 Abraham's attainment of manhood (compare Sanhedrin 107b)
 Jacob sneezes and does not die
 the sun and moon remain immovable at the command of Joshua
 King Hezekiah becomes ill, but recovers
 Daniel in the lion's den.
 Moses is slandered by Aaron and Miriam.
 Absalom and his death.
 God's eighth appearance—in punishment of Miriam.

Customs mentioned 

Many ancient customs that are not found in other sources are described in this work.

The following Jewish customs and laws are referred to in the Pirkei de-Rabbi Eliezer: 
 The blessing "Bore me'ore ha-esh" (Praised be the Creator of the fire) recited during Havdalah (chapter 20; compare Pesachim 106a).
 Gazing at the fingernails during this blessing (chapter 20).
 After Havdalah, pouring of the wine upon the table, extinguishing the candle in it, dipping the hands in it, and rubbing the eyes (ch. 20).
 The prohibition against women doing fancy-work on Rosh Chodesh (ch. 45).
 The prayer for dew on the first day of the Passover (chapter 32).
 The sounding of the shofar after the morning services in all the synagogues on the New Moon of the month of Elul (ch. xlvi.).
 The addition of Deut. 11:21 to the daily reading of the Shema (chapter 23).
 The banquet after the circumcision (ch. 29; comp. Midr. Teh., ed. Buber, p. 234b).
 The chair of Elijah during the circumcision (ch. 29).
 The covering of the prepuce with earth (ch. 29).
 The performance of the marriage ceremony under a canopy (ch. 12).
 The standing of the hazzan beside the bridal couple (ch. 41).
 The pronouncing of the blessing upon the bride by the hazzan (ch. 12).
 That no woman may go out with uncovered head (ch. 14; compare Ketuvot 72a).
 That the groom may not go out alone on the bridal night (ch. 16; compare Berachot 54b);
 That mourners must be comforted in the chapel (ch. 17);
 That the dead may be buried only in "takrikin" (ch. 33; compare Moed Kattan 27a,b);
 That a person sneezing shall say, "I trust in Thy help, O Lord," while any one hearing him shall say, "Your health!" (ch. 52)—sickness having been unknown before the time of the patriarch Jacob, whose soul escaped through his nose when he sneezed.
 The often-repeated text (recited at the 'Bedtime Shema', etc.) "In the name of the Lord, God of Israel, may Michael be at my right, Gabriel to my left..." may have its origins here (ch. 4).

The following chapters close with benedictions from Shemoneh Esreh:
 ch. 27: "Praised be Thou, O Lord, the shield of Abraham"
 ch. 31: "Praised be Thou, O Lord, who revivest the dead"
 ch. 35: "Praised be Thou, O Lord, Holy God"
 ch. 40: "Praised be Thou, O Lord, who dost pardon knowingly"
 ch. 43: "Praised be Thou, O Lord, who demandest penitence."
Chapters 17, 30, 31, 46, 51, 52, 54 also remind one of Shemoneh Esreh.

The Tekufot 

The work includes astronomical discussions related to the story of the Creation. It dwells longest on the description of the second day of Creation, in which the "Ma'aseh Merkabah" (Ezekiel 1) is described in various forms, and although this passage recalls Donnolo and the Alphabet of R. Akiba, it is evidently much older, since it does not mention the "Hekalot." This description is connected with that of the creation of the seven planets and the twelve signs of the zodiac, the reference to the "machzors" and the "tekufot," and the discussion of the intercalation. In the series of years (3, 6, 8, 11, 14, 17, 19 in the cycle of 19) in which the intercalation takes place, the author substitutes the fifth year for the sixth. His cycle of the moon, furthermore, covers 21 years, at the end of which period the moon again occupies the same position in the week as at the beginning, but this can happen only once in 689,472 years, according to the common computation.

Dating and authorship 
The composition date of Pirke de Rabbi Eliezer is generally put towards the end of the 8th- and beginning of the 9th century.  The text itself attributes the authorship of the text to Tannaim such as Rabbi Eliezer ben Hyrcanus, Shimon bar Yochai, and Judah bar Ilai.

The author seems to have been a rabbi of the Land of Israel. This appears not only from the fact that some of the customs to which he refers (in chapters 13 and 20) are known only as customs of the Land of Israel, but also from the fact that nearly all the authorities quoted are from the Land of Israel (the exceptions being Rav Mesharshiya and Rav Shemaiah, who are from Babylonia). The work is traditionally ascribed to R. Eliezer (80-118 C.E.), but in fact cannot have been written by him. Several sources quoted in it were composed after Eliezer's death, including Pirkei Avot and quotes from several 3rd-century Talmudic authorities, indicating that the work was edited or additions were made to it after the time of R. Eliezer.

Later interpolations
Jost was the first to point out that in the 30th chapter, there is a clear allusion to the three stages of the Muslim conquest - that of Arabia (משא בערב), of Spain (איי הים), and of Rome (830 C.E.; כרך גדול רומי); also the names of Fatima and Ayesha occur beside that of Ishmael, leading to the conclusion that the book originated in a time when Islam was predominant in Asia Minor. In chapter 36 two brothers reigning simultaneously are mentioned, after whose reign the Messiah shall come; this might place the work in the beginning of the 9th century, for about that time the two sons of Harun al-Rashid (Al-Amin and Al-Ma'mun) were ruling over the Islamic realm. If a statement in chapter 28 did not point to an even earlier date, approximately the same date might be inferred from the enumeration of the four powerful kingdoms and the substitution of Ishmael for one of the four which are enumerated in the Talmud and the Mekhilta. However, the interpolation may have no effect upon the contested connection between this text and the Qur'an which receives two separate 1st century attributions within the text, within a 100 word span. According to the most recent research by N.A. Stillman & B. Wheeler, what was once thought to have been a Jewish-midrashic influence on Islam is, due to recent research, the reverse. Thus N.A. Stillman comes to the conclusion that: "Our chronology of rabbanic literature is better today than in Geiger's, and many more texts - Muslim, Jewish, and Christian - have since being published. In the light of this we know now that in some instances what was thought to be a Jewish haggadic influence in an Islamic text might well be quite the reverse. The Pirqe de Rabbi Eli`ezer, for example, would seem to have been finally redacted after the advent of Islam. "He further adds that one should be cautious when it comes to assigning origins to the Quran : "In conclusion, it should be emphasized that one should be extremely cautious about assigning specific origins to the story discussed here - or for that matter, any other story in the Qur'an". Some Rishonim, such as Meir ben Solomon Abi-Sahula adopted a kabbalistic approach to the text.

Chapters one and two and the attribution to Rabbi Eliezer
The topic of chapters one and two of the composition is the beginnings of Rabbi Eliezer ben Hyrkanus; it is due to them that medieval sages attributed the entire work to him. However, Zunz conclusively proved that this traditional ascription is not historically accurate. Based on an ancient list of works found in the Cairo Genizah, scholars have posited that these chapters were transferred to PdRE from Avot de-Rabbi Natan (version II, chapter 13), and that they were not originally part of the composition that we now call PdRE. This is further proved by one manuscript which places the title “Pirkei R. Eliezer ben Hyrkanus” and begins the chapter numbering only after chapter two. Nevertheless, it is critical to note that both chapters are found in all full manuscripts of the composition, which increases the likelihood that they have always been part of the composition. Furthermore, examination of the language of these chapters also points to the fact that these chapters are properly considered part of the composition. PdRE contains distinct literary phrases which appear and reappear throughout the entire work. Despite the fact that the core language of these two chapters is almost identical to that found in Avot de-Rabbi Natan, a unique phrase found in PdRE, absent from the parallel in Avot de-Rabbi Natan, is present here as well.

The question of the completeness of PdRE
Zunz detected two literary structures around which the work is organized, but which are incomplete in the work as it is known to us today:
 At the beginning of chapter fourteen there is a list of ten times that God descended into the world. These “descents” are expounded upon in various places throughout the work. However, the last descent to appear is the eighth; the final two are missing. 
 From chapter 26 and onwards, several chapters conclude with a blessing from the Shemoneh Esreh prayer, but the last blessing mentioned is "who heals the sick" (8th of the 19 blessings of Shemoneh Esreh).
Both of these phenomena may indicate that the work was never actually completed by its author. Zunz also raised another possibility: that the work was at one point complete, but that parts of it were lost in its early period. This suggestion has found widespread acceptance among scholars, who overwhelmingly agree that the composition as it is in our hands is missing pieces that were once in existence. Rabbi David Luria (1798-1855), the most important traditional commentator on PdRE, and others scrutinized other rabbinic compositions to find chapters and quotes that were originally part of PdRE and were lost in its later transmission. However, subsequent analysis by Treitl has usually demonstrated that the ascription of these pieces of other works to a more original PdRE is without basis. As far as the claim that the structure of PdRE shows signs that parts of the composition are missing, Treitl's examination demonstrates that when it comes to the conclusion of chapters with blessings from the Shemoneh Esreh, the structure is fundamentally defective and was at no point complete. No textual witness includes the blessing for forgiveness or redemption (and Zunz completed them based on his own conjecture), and the blessings over sanctity and health appear in only some textual witnesses. Chapter 10 concludes with a reference to the blessing for converts, making it clearly out of place within the larger composition, which only begins referring to the blessings in chapter 26. It seems therefore likely that the author of the work never succeeded in weaving all of the various blessings into the work in their correct order. This leads to a suggestion that rather than assuming the existence of chapters that were once part of the work and somehow disappeared, there is a greater likelihood that the author never successfully completed his work.

The passage that concludes the composition in all of the complete manuscripts may be interpreted as referring to this situation. In this passage the author praises Abraham, Isaac, and Jacob, describing them as diligent workers who receive their wages after their work has been completed. In contrast, he describes the generation of their offspring as lazy workers who request their wages out of mercy, before they even complete their work (this passage as well as other passages at the end of the concluding chapter are missing from the editio princeps, because the manuscript upon which the editio princeps is based was missing the last page.) Treitl suggests that, by ending the work with this exegesis the author wished to hint that by laying down his pen before his work is truly completed he too is one of these “lazy” offspring.

Manuscripts and editions 

There are over one hundred known manuscripts of the work. All surviving manuscripts contain some of the same common errors, whose origins lie in a proto-tradition from which all existent manuscripts ultimately stem. Despite the antiquity of this proto-tradition it is still not identical with the composition as it was created by the author.

The textual witnesses can be divided into three groupings. Along with the complete and lengthy manuscripts, a number of partial manuscripts and genizah fragments have survived. Most of these can be classified as belonging to one of the main textual groupings.

Manuscripts of PdRE are found at Parma (No. 541), in the Vatican (No. 303; dated 1509), and in the Halberstam library. The following editions are known: Constantinople, 1518; Venice, 1548; Sabbioneta, 1568; Amsterdam, 1712; Wilna, 1837; Lemberg, 1864. A commentary upon it (by David Luria) is included in the Vilna edition, and another (by Abraham Broydé) in the Lemberg edition.

On the connection of PdRE with the Baraita of Samuel, see S. Sachs.

References

Bibliography 
Zunz, G. V. pp. 283 et seq.;
Adelman, Rachel.  The Return of the Repressed: Pirqe De-Rabbi Eliezer and the Pseudepigrapha (2009)
Treitl, Eliezer. Pirkei de-Rabbi Eliezer: Text, Redaction and a Sample Synopsis,  Hebrew University of Jerusalem and Yad ben Tzvi,  2012). (in Hebrew)
Sacks, Steven Daniel Midrash and Multiplicity: Pirke de-Rabbi Eliezer and the Reinvention of Rabbinic Interpretive Culture (2009) 
Jost, Gesch. des Judenthums und Seiner Sekten, p. 35, note 2, Leipsic, 1858;
 Senior Sachs, in Kerem Ḥemed, viii. 34;
 Ueber das Gegenseitige Verhältniss, etc., in Monatsschrift, i. 277;
 Teḥiyah, Berlin, 1850, p. 14, note 5; p. 20, note 2;
 H. Kahana, in Ha-Maggid, viii. 6;
S. Friedmann, in Rahmer's Jüd. Lit.-Blatt. viii. 30–31, 34, 37;
Moritz Steinschneider, in Ha-Yonah, i. 17, Berlin, 1851;
Raphael Kirchheim, in Introductio in Librum Talmudicum de Samaritanis, p. 25. Frankfort-on-the-Main, 1851;
Meïr ha-Levi Horwitz, Mishnat Rabbi Eliezer, in Ha-Maggid, xxiii., Nos. 8-30;
Fuenn, Keneset Yisrael, i. 321–344, Warsaw, 1886;
Israel Luria, in Kokebe Yiẓḥaḳ, xxv. 82;
Israel Lévi, in R. E. J. xviii. 83;
Michael Creizenach, in Jost's Annalen, ii. 140;
Heinrich Grätz, in Monatsschrift, 1859, p. 112, note 5;
Bacher, Ag. Tan. i. 122–123, Strasburg, 1903.

External links 
 Pirkei De-Rabbi Eliezer Original Hebrew and Gerald Friedlander translation
 Pirqe Rabbi Eliezer Electronic Text Editing Project (digital images of original codices)* 
 Weekly Shiurim on Pirkei D'Rabbi Eliezer from TorahDownloads.com

Aggadic Midrashim
Nimrod